Hošťálkovy is a municipality and village in Bruntál District in the Moravian-Silesian Region of the Czech Republic. It has about 600 inhabitants.

Administrative parts
Villages of Křížová, Staré Purkartice and Vraclávek are administrative parts of Hošťálkovy.

History
The first written mention of Hošťálkovy is from 1281.

Gallery

References

Villages in Bruntál District